Jogshelu is situated in Shindkheda tehsil and located in Dhule district of Maharashtra. It is one of 141 villages in Sindkhede Block, along with villages like Dalwade, Vikharan and Chaugaon. Nearby railway stations are Vikharan, Shindkheda and Dondaicha.

References

Villages in Dhule district